Dracula cordobae is a species of orchid found in the montane cloud forest of south western Ecuador at elevations of 750 to 1000 meters.

Description
It is a medium-sized orchid, with an epiphyte habit and with very short ramicaules basally wrapped by 2 to 3 acuminate tubular sheaths and bearing a single, apical, narrowly obovate leaf that is conduplicated below the petiole. It blooms in a lateral inflorescence, from the base of the ramicaule, with successively a single flower that heads below the plant.

Taxonomy
The type species was discovered by Sr. Clever Córdova in El Oro, Ecuador at 800 meters, July 19, 1979 and described in the journal Selbyana by Carlyle A. Luer

References

External links

cordobae
Flora of Ecuador